The 1984 Family Circle Cup was a tennis tournament played on outdoor clay courts in Hilton Head, South Carolina in the  United States that was part of the 1984 Virginia Slims World Championship Series. The tournament was held from April 9 through April 15, 1984. First-seeded Chris Evert-Lloyd won the singles title, her seventh at the event.

Finals

Singles
 Chris Evert-Lloyd defeated  Claudia Kohde-Kilsch 6–2, 6–3
 It was Evert's 2nd singles title of the year and the 128th of her career.

Doubles
 Claudia Kohde-Kilsch /  Hana Mandlíková defeated  Anne Hobbs /  Sharon Walsh 6–3, 6–3
 It was Kohde-Kilsch's 1st title of the year and the 7th of her career. It was Mandlíková's 7th title of the year and the 25th of her career.

External links
 Women's Tennis Association (WTA) tournament edition details
 International Tennis Federation (ITF) tournament edition details

Family Circle Cup
Charleston Open
Family Circle Cup
Family Circle Cup
Family Circle Cup